Adlerstein is a surname. Notable people with the surname include:

Michael Adlerstein, United Nations official
Yitzchok Adlerstein (born 1950), American Orthodox rabbi